John Rollin Lupton (August 23, 1928 – November 3, 1993) was an American film and television actor.

Early years
Lupton was the son of Adelma Lupton and Dorothy Marsh Lupton. He developed an interest in drama while he was a student at Shorewood High School in Shorewood, Wisconsin. He pursued acting via an apprenticeship with a stock theater company in New York, and after graduating he toured with the Strawbridge Children's Theater Company.

Career
After graduating from New York's American Academy of Dramatic Arts, Lupton acted with stock companies in Ocean City, New Jersey, and Saratoga Springs, New York.

Lupton was tall, lanky and handsome very much like James Stewart or Henry Fonda but never achieved similar fame while accumulating over 260 credits in film productions and on television. He was signed as a contract player at MGM in Hollywood and made his first film appearance in On the Town in 1949.

He co-starred in 1956 with Fess Parker in Disney's The Great Locomotive Chase. During the 1954-1955 television season, Lupton appeared in several episodes as a college student in the CBS sitcom, The Halls of Ivy. He also played Chris Lambert on the NBC series Fury (1955-1960), Indian agent Tom Jeffords on the TV series "Broken Arrow" 1956-1958, and Frank on the ABC serial Never Too Young (1965-1966).

On October 30, 1959, Lupton appeared in the episode "Client Peter Warren" of the ABC western series Black Saddle, playing Peter Warren, a man accused by townspeople of starting a fire that caused the death of his estranged wife's wealthy and respected aunt. Lupton made two guest appearances on Perry Mason in 1959 and 1960.  His first role was as Wally Dunbar in "The Case of the Bartered Bikini," then he played Peter Nichols in "The Case of the Lavender Lipstick." In 1959, he was cast as a struggling writer in The Rebel Set.

In 1959, Lupton portrayed the historical Buffalo Bill Cody in the episode "The Grand Duke," on the syndicated anthology series, Death Valley Days.The episode focuses on the friendship that developed when the skeptical Cody was assigned by the United States Army to escort The Grand Duke of Russia on a western buffalo hunt. In 1961, Lupton was cast in still another Death Valley Days episode, "South of Horror Flats", as Pinkerton agent Allen Hodges, who is hired by a ghost-plagued woman to take her and her fortune in gold to San Francisco.

In 1960, Lupton guest starred as Andrew Sykes in the episode "The Triple Cross" of the syndicated crime drama, U.S. Marshal. That same year, he also appeared in a variety of programs, including Sea Hunt, Men into Space, Richard Diamond, Private Detective, Tales of Wells Fargo, and Checkmate.

On April 25, 1961, Lupton played the role of Fred Powers in "Killers' Odds", an episode of NBC's Laramie. Series character Jess Harper (Robert Fuller) comes upon Powers, a stranger with a price on his head, though the charge is fraudulent because he had killed in self-defense.

In 1961, Lupton was cast as Dr. John "Buzz" Neldrum in the episode "A Doctor Comes to Town" of the comedy/drama Window on Main Street, starring Robert Young as an author who returns to his hometown after the death of his wife and child.
 
Lupton guest starred as Amber in the 1961 episode, "The Platinum Highway", of ABC's crime drama, Target: The Corruptors. He guest-starred in the 1965 episode "What Television Show Does Your Dog Watch?" of the CBS situation comedy The Cara Williams Show. He appeared, too, on NBC's Daniel Boone.
“[Dragnet.TV (1968)
Sgt Carl Maxwell:S10:E6

Lupton later appeared in the 1965 biblical film The Greatest Story Ever Told as the speaker of the town of Capernaum, and as Jesse James in the 1966 cult horror western, Jesse James Meets Frankenstein's Daughter.

His later film career included roles in The Day of the Wolves (1971), The Astronaut (1972), Cool Breeze (1972), Napoleon and Samantha (1972), The Slams (1973), The Phantom of Hollywood (1974) and Airport 1975 (1974).

Lupton's other Disney film appearances were in The World's Greatest Athlete (1973) as the race starter, The Whiz Kid and the Carnival Caper (1976), The Young Runaways (1978) and The Secret of Lost Valley (1980).

In 1965, Lupton starred in a well-remembered TV commercial for pain reliever Anacin, playing a harried husband with a headache, yelling at his hectoring wife, "Helen, please, I just got home...Don't rush me!"

Additionally, he was featured on the daytime soap opera Days of Our Lives in the pivotal role of Dr. Tom (Tommy) Horton, Jr., from 1967 to 1980.

Walk of Fame
John Lupton has a star on the Hollywood Walk of Fame located on the west side of the 1700 block of Vine Street.

Personal life
On April 7, 1956, Lupton married Anne Sills, and they had a daughter, Rollin. They divorced three years later, and on July 24, 1969, he wed Dian Friml in Las Vegas, to whom he was still married at the time of his death.

Death
Lupton died in 1993 at the age of 65.

He was survived by his daughter, Rollin Tyson Lupton, with his first wife, Anne; second wife, Dian Friml Beckley, the granddaughter of musical composer Rudolf Friml, and three granddaughters: Parker, named for his acting friend Fess Parker, Holly, and Hilary. He also has a granddaughter Brianna, who resides in Florida.

Filmography

References

External links

1928 births
1993 deaths
20th-century American male actors
American male film actors
American male television actors
American male stage actors
People from Highland Park, Illinois
People from Shorewood, Wisconsin
Male actors from Greater Los Angeles
Western (genre) television actors
Shorewood High School (Wisconsin) alumni